Gage Roads Brew Co (formerly Gage Roads Brewing Company) is an Australian craft brewery located just outside the city of Fremantle in Palmyra, Western Australia. It is one of Australia's largest independent breweries. In 2016, its new-world pale ale - "Little Dove" - was awarded the Trophy for Champion Australian Beer at the 2016 Australian International Beer Awards. In 2015, it was runner-up Champion Large Brewery at the Australian International Beer Awards.

History
Gage Roads was founded by Bill Hoedemaker, John Hoedemaker and Peter Nolin in 2002. The brewery is named after Gage Roads, a roadstead in the Indian Ocean between Fremantle and Rottnest Island off the coast of Western Australia.

Gage Roads was listed on the ASX (stock code: GRB) in 2006 and remains Australia’s only remaining listed brewery. In 2009 Woolworths Limited acquired a 25 per cent share in the brewer for $2 million. The investment allowed Gage Roads to purchase a state-of-the-art 100 hectolitre brewhouse from German manufacturer Krones, with its installation increasing capacity to 2.2 million cases per annum.

In 2015 the brewer executed a comprehensive refresh of its core craft beers, adding three new beers to its year-round lineup. The refresh proved to be extremely successful, with increased sales now making Gage Roads one of the largest craft brewers in Australia. In late 2016, Gage Roads bought-back Woolworths Limited 25 per cent stake, returning the company to independence.

Beers

Major awards

See also

 List of breweries in Australia

References

Notes

Bibliography

External links
 Gage Road Brewing Company website

Australian beer brands
Australian companies established in 2002
Food and drink companies established in 2002
Beer brewing companies based in Western Australia